Attack Squadron 54 (VA-54) was an attack squadron of the U.S. Navy. Originally established as Bomber Fighter Squadron VBF-153 on 26 March 1945, redesignated Fighter Squadron VF-61A (VF-16A) on 15 November 1946, redesignated VF-152 on 15 July 1948, and VF-54 on 15 February 1950. It was finally redesignated VA-54 on 15 June 1956. The squadron was disestablished on 1 April 1958. It was the second squadron to be designated VA-54, the first VA-54 was disestablished on 1 December 1949.

The squadron's insignia changed several times over its lifetime, ending up as a devil's head with naval aviation wings. Its nickname was the Copperheads until 1951, and Hell's Angels thereafter.

Operational history
 29 June 1950: VF-54 was deployed aboard  in the Western Pacific when the Korean War broke out on 25 June. The carrier was ordered north from the Philippines and the squadron’s aircraft conducted a sweep along the western coast of Taiwan due to the concern that the North Korean invasion of South Korea might be a prelude to an invasion of that island by the Chinese Communists.
 3 July 1950: The squadron participated in its first combat strikes since its establishment in 1945. These strikes were the first made by carrier aircraft in the Korean War. VF-54’s F4Us struck targets in Pyongyang, North Korea.
 15 September 1950: VF-54 provided air support for the Battle of Inchon.
 26 July 1954: VF-54’s AD-4 Skyraiders were on a search and rescue mission looking for survivors, rafts or debris from the 1954 Cathay Pacific Douglas DC-4 shootdown, when they were attacked by two Chinese LA-7 fighter aircraft. Two of the squadron’s AD-4s, along with an F4U, shot down the two LA-7s 13 miles southeast of Hainan Island.
 September 1957: , with VA-54 embarked, operated in the vicinity of Taiwan in response to a buildup of Chinese Communist forces on the mainland opposite Taiwan.
 Dec 1957: The squadron began the transition from propeller aircraft to jets.

Home port assignments
The squadron was assigned to these home ports, effective on the dates shown:
 NAS Wildwood – 26 Mar 1945
 NAAS Oceana – 01 Jun 1945
 NAS Norfolk – 02 Jul 1946
 NAS Alameda – 11 Aug 1946
 NAS Sand Point – 4 May 1948
 NAS Alameda – 28 Jun 1948
 NAS San Diego – 01 Dec 1949
 NAS Miramar – 19 May 1952

Aircraft assignment
The squadron first received the following aircraft on the dates shown:
 F4U-1 Corsair – 26 Mar 1945
 F4U-4 Corsair – 04 Jun 1945
 F6F-5 Hellcat – 10 Sep 1945
 F8F-1 Bearcat – 21 Oct 1947
 F8F-2 Bearcat – May 1949
 AD-4 Skyraider – 01 Dec 1949
 F4U-4B Corsair – 14 Dec 1949
 AD-1/4 Skyraider – Mar 1951
 AD-6 Skyraider – Dec 1954
 AD-5 Skyraider – Dec 1954
 AD-7 Skyraider – Jan 1957
 F9F-8B Cougar – Dec 1957

See also
 Attack aircraft
 History of the United States Navy
 List of inactive United States Navy aircraft squadrons

References

Attack squadrons of the United States Navy
Wikipedia articles incorporating text from the Dictionary of American Naval Aviation Squadrons